Back Mesa is an ice-covered, flat-topped mountain with rock exposures,  high, located east of Hidden Lake on the Ulu Peninsula, James Ross Island, Antarctica. Following British Antarctic Survey geological work, 1985–86, it was named by the UK Antarctic Place-Names Committee after Dr. Eric H. Back, Lieutenant Royal Naval Volunteer Reserve, medical officer on Operation Tabarin at Port Lockroy, 1943–44, and Hope Bay, 1944–45.  Hear about Operation Tabarin as recorded by Dr Eric Back  for BAC

References
 

Mesas of Antarctica
Landforms of James Ross Island
Landforms of Graham Land